Aiedh Al-Joni  (born February 15, 1988) is a Saudi football player who plays for Al-Suqoor as a midfielder.

References

1988 births
Living people
Saudi Arabian footballers
Al-Suqoor FC players
Al-Orobah FC players
Hajer FC players
Place of birth missing (living people)
Najran SC players
Al Jandal Club players
Al-Hejaz Club players
Al-Washm Club players
Tuwaiq Club players
Qilwah FC players
Saudi First Division League players
Saudi Professional League players
Saudi Second Division players
Association football midfielders